Karl Mahlburg is an American mathematician whose research interests lie in the areas of modular forms, partitions, combinatorics and number theory.

He submitted a paper to Proceedings of the National Academy of Sciences (PNAS) entitled Partition Congruences and the Andrews-Garvan-Dyson Crank in 2005, and the paper won the PNAS first Paper of the Year prize.

The paper extends a result first conjectured by Srinivasa Ramanujan and later detailed by Freeman Dyson, George Andrews, Frank Garvan, and Mahlburg's advisor Ken Ono called the crank having to do with congruence patterns in partitions.  Until recently such congruence patterns were only known to occur for 5, 7, and 11.  Mahlburg's result extends this to all prime numbers.

Mahlburg was an undergraduate at Harvey Mudd College, where he graduated with highest distinction in 2001 with a B.S. in Mathematics. In 2006, he graduated from the University of Wisconsin–Madison with a Ph.D. in Mathematics. He was an associate professor at LSU.

References

External links
Mahlburg makes math history
Article from PhysOrg.com
Mathematician untangles legendary problem

Year of birth missing (living people)
Living people
21st-century American mathematicians
Combinatorialists
Number theorists
Harvey Mudd College alumni
University of Wisconsin–Madison College of Letters and Science alumni
Louisiana State University faculty